Dunwich Heath is an area of coastal lowland heath just south of the village of Dunwich, in the Suffolk Coast and Heaths AONB, England. It is adjacent to the RSPB reserve at Minsmere. It lies within the area of the Minsmere-Walberswick Heaths and Marshes Site of Special Scientific Interest, Special Area of Conservation and Special Protection Area.

It has been owned by the National Trust since 1968, when it was bought with the help of a donation from the Heinz company as part of Enterprise Neptune.

Dunwich Heath is a rare survival of coastal lowland heath; the Suffolk Sandlings used to form a lot of the Suffolk coast, but have mostly been developed for agriculture or built upon. The heath is mostly covered with heather, both Common Heather and Bell Heather, and European and Western Gorse but there is also some woodland and grassland included in the reserve. The heather and gorse flower from June until September; the heather is purple and pink while the gorse is yellow.

A variety of birds, animals and reptiles live on the heath; red deer, muntjacs, Dartford warblers, European stonechats, and  European nightjars, as well as adders, slowworms, grass snakes and common lizards. It supports many unusual invertebrates as well, such as ant lions, digger wasps, mining bees, as well as the true lover's knot moth, and the emperor moth.

Dunwich Heath Cliff
Dunwich Heath Cliff is designated a regionally important geological site. The cliffs are formed of Norwich Crag Formation. The layers of large flint cobbles are known locally as the "Westleton Beds".

References

External links

 Dunwich Heath information on the National Trust website
 Article by the then Warden of the Heath
 Article about the Suffolk coast

Geography of Suffolk
National Trust properties in Suffolk
Nature Conservation Review sites
Tourist attractions in Suffolk
Heaths of the United Kingdom
Dunwich